Kooyonga Golf Club is a private golf club in Australia, located in South Australia at Lockleys, a suburb west of Adelaide. Members entry is off May Terrace, Brooklyn Park.

Work on the course started in 1922 and the first nine holes opened on 19 May 1923. In August, the course hosted a country championship, for players from outside Adelaide, won by Mr. Haehrmann from Ambleside. The same month the Australian Open was played at Royal Adelaide and the opportunity was taken to organise a 36-hole professional event at the club, on the day after the open. Arthur Ham won the event with a score of 161, a stroke ahead of Arthur Le Fevre. the course was extended to 18 holes in 1924.

The Simpson Cup was originally for competition between The Kooyonga Golf Club & The Royal Adelaide Golf Club from 1927 to 1938. Post World War 2 the Grange & Glenelg Golf Clubs joined the annual competition and in 2008 Southern District and Mid-North District entered teams also. As at 2022 Kooyonga has won 33 Simpson Cups and Royal Adelaide has won 10 

Kooyonga has hosted six Australian Opens (five men's and one women's), twenty South Australian Opens and two Australian Amateur Championships.

The world's greatest golfers (including Walter Hagen and the "Big Three" Palmer, Nicklaus and Player) have all played at Kooyonga over its long and rich history.

 Golf icon Walter Hagen played the Kooyonga Golf Course in the 1930s.  Sensationally, the Kooyonga Golf Club Secretary of the time was arrested and remanded for embezzling 131 pounds that was to be paid to Walter Hagen and J Kirkwood. However a few years later when asked about Australian Golf Courses, Hagen mentioned Kooyonga as the one he rated extremely highly, describing the course as a "hard test".
In 1950 Harry Vardon Trophy winner Norman Von Nida won the Australian Open at Kooyonga 
In 1961 American Golf Great, The King Arnold Palmer defeated Gary Player by 4 strokes at Kooyonga
The Black Knight Gary Player has won two Australian Opens there and in 1965,  the Golden Bear, Jack Nicklaus was runner up to Player in the Australian Open at Kooyonga.
Five times British Open winner, and Presidents Cup winning Captain, Peter Thomson won the Australian Open at Kooyonga in 1972.
 LIV Golf CEO, the Great White Shark, Greg Norman has played at Kooyonga on a number of occasions, winning the South Australian Open there twice Greg Norman regarded winning the 1996 South Australian Open at Kooyonga as particularly important for him 
In 2018 the world number 1 female golfer, Ko Jin-Young won the Women's Australian Open at Kooyonga
The Women's Australian Open was scheduled to return to Kooyonga in February 2022, however Covid travel restrictions have caused that event to be cancelled for the year.

The golf course also has a history of high profile members, including Sir Donald Bradman, Australian Test Cricket player and media personality Greg Blewett, Tennis legend Mark Woodforde, Cricket legend Rod Marsh and State Footballer Andrew Payze among other captains of South Australian and Australian Industry

Kooyonga Golf Course, albeit exclusive is noted as a significant attraction for interstate and international visitors by the South Australian Government Tourism Commission 

In 2023 the Australian Golf Digest Magazine ranked the top 100 Golf Courses in Australia, and Kooyonga was elevated to the number 20 position on that list.

Tournaments hosted 
2021 Australian Amateur
2018 Women's Australian Open
2007 South Australian Open
1996-2004 South Australian Open
1982-86 South Australian Open
1980 South Australian Open
1976 South Australian Open
1972 Australian Open
1971 South Australian Open
1966 Adelaide Advertiser Tournament
1965 South Australian Open
1964 Adelaide Advertiser Tournament
1965 Australian Open
1962 Adelaide Advertiser Tournament
1962 Australian Amateur
1961 South Australian Open
1960 Adelaide Advertiser Tournament
1958 Adelaide Advertiser Tournament
1958 Australian PGA Championship
1958 Australian Open
1956 Adelaide Advertiser Tournament
1954 Australian Open
1951 Adelaide Advertiser Tournament
1950 Australian Open
1949 Adelaide Advertiser Tournament

References

Further reading
V. M. Branson (1983) Kooyonga 1923–1983, the Story of a Golf Club

External links

Sports venues in Adelaide
Sporting clubs in Adelaide
Golf clubs and courses in South Australia
Sports venues completed in 1923
1923 establishments in Australia